The Royal Society of Architects in Wales (RSAW) is the Wales region of the Royal Institute of British Architects (RIBA). The society was granted Royal status by the Privy Council in 1994.

It is based in Cardiff, with four branches throughout Wales; Design Circle (RSAW South), Mid Wales Branch, North Wales Society of Architects and West Wales Branch. In 2007 the Society represented around 800 architects in Wales.

RSAW regularly organises competitions to highlight good architecture in Wales. In 2012 it held a competition entitled ReDesigning the Terrace, with the 12 shortlisted entries displayed at its conference in December 2012.

Recent presidents

 1977-1979: Dale Owen
 ? Maureen Kelly Owen
 2003–2005: Ruth Reed
 2005–2007: Jonathan Adams
 2007–2009: Gareth Scourfield 
 2009–2011: Pierre Wassenaar 
 2011–2013: Andrew Sutton 
 2013–2015: Dan Benham 
 2015–2017: Robert Firth
 2017–2019: Carolyn Merrifield
 2019–2021 : Ryan Stuckey
 2021–2021 : Gavin Traylor

References

External links

Architecture organisations based in the United Kingdom
Architects in Wales
Organisations based in Cardiff
Professional associations based in Wales
Architecture-related professional associations